Lukoran  is a village in Croatia, located on the Adriatic island of Ugljan overlooking at the Zadar peninsula. It is connected with other island villages with the State route D110. Lukoran was mentioned in the year 1068. It was the birthplace of Šimun Klimantović* (Klemenović, around 1460-1540), a Glagolitic writer, as he said for himself in his chronicle of the Glagolitic (1511). His two collections are kept in Zagreb and in the Russian National Library in St. Petersburg.

Lukoran is a village mainly active in fishing, agriculture and tourism. It has four settlements: Mali Lukoran, Turkija, Veli Lukoran and Prkljug. The highest peak of the island is Šćah (286 m).

References

External links

 All about Lukoran

Populated places in Zadar County
Ugljan